{{DISPLAYTITLE:C5H4O3}}
The molecular formula C5H4O3 (molar mass: 112.08 g/mol, exact mass: 112.0160 u) may refer to:

 2-Furoic acid
 Itaconic anhydride

Molecular formulas